Executive Travel magazine was an American bimonthly magazine published in New York City by Time Inc. The magazine, launched in May 2002, was published 6 times a year. Geared toward upscale executives, the magazine covered relevant topics on business, travel and affluent lifestyle. 

Executive Travel offered exclusive reach to American Express Corporate Platinum Cardmembers. The publication was initially released by American Express Publishing but was sold on October 1, 2013 to Time Inc.

On February 4, 2014 Time Inc. announced that it was to cease publishing the magazine. The final issue was the December 2013/January 2014 issue.

References

External links

Flane Travel App

2002 establishments in New York City
2014 disestablishments in New York (state)
Business magazines published in the United States
Bimonthly magazines published in the United States
American Express
Defunct magazines published in the United States
Magazines established in 2002
Magazines disestablished in 2014
Magazines published in New York City
Tourism magazines